Mooi Choo Chuah from Lehigh University in Bethlehem, Pennsylvania, was named Fellow of the Institute of Electrical and Electronics Engineers (IEEE) in 2015 for contributions to wireless network system and protocol design. In 2017, she was elected a fellow of the National Academy of Inventors.

References

External links

20th-century births
Living people
Lehigh University faculty
Fellow Members of the IEEE
Year of birth missing (living people)
Place of birth missing (living people)